Oxystylis is a monotypic genus of flowering plants currently considered a part of the cleome family containing the single species Oxystylis lutea, which is known by the common name spiny caper. It is native to the Mojave Desert straddling the border between California and Nevada. It grows in rocky and sandy desert habitat, often on alkaline soils. This is an annual herb producing an erect, branching stem which may reach 1.5 meters in height. The leaf is made up of three thick, firm leaflets 2 to 6 centimeters long, borne on a stout, straight petiole. The inflorescence is a dense head of flowers clustered about the stem at the leaf axils, each flower with four small yellow petals. The fruit is a small white or purple nutlet bearing the spine-like remnant of the flower receptacle.

References

External links
 Jepson Manual Treatment
 Photo gallery

Cleomaceae
Monotypic Brassicales genera
Flora of the California desert regions
Flora of Nevada
Flora without expected TNC conservation status